Filmography 2001–2005 is Namie Amuro's third original music video collection and collects most of her videos from "Say the Word" (2001) to "White Light" (2005).

Track listing 
 "Say the Word" (Namie Amuro, Ronald Malmberg, Thomas Johansson) – 4:24
 "I Will" (Namie Amuro, Hiroaki Hayama) – 6:42
 "Wishing on the Same Star"(Diane Warren, kenko-p) – 4:53
 "Shine More" (Scott Nickoley, Sandra Pires, Paul Taylor, H.U.B) – 3:55
 "Put 'Em Up" (Dallas Austin, Jasper Cameron, Michico) – 4:03
 "So Crazy" (Full Force, Jennifer "JJ" Johnson, Michico, Tiger) – 4:34
 "Alarm" (Jusme, Monk) – 4:22
 "All for You" (Natsumi Watanabe, Ryoki Matsumoto) – 5:58
 "Girl Talk" (Michico, T.Kura) – 4:25
 "Want Me, Want Me" (Michico, SUGI-V) – 3:12
 "WoWa" (Nao'ymt) – 4:15
 "White Light" (Nao'ymt) – 5:32

Personnel 
Numbers in parentheses following listed names corresponded to the track list
Artist
Namie Amuro
Choreographer
Chihiro (TRF) (9)
Etsu (TRF) (9)
Ken (Da Pump) (11)
Yumeko (1)
Warner (4,5,6,7,10)
Dancer
Erika (10)
Gen (6,10)
George (5,10)
Hide (11)
Hiroko Ishikawa (1)
Iyo-P (1)
Ken (6)
Mako (4,5)
Maya (4)
Mayumi (6,7,9)
Megumi (10)
Misa (6)
Nazuki (10)
Shige (5,6,7)
Shinosuke (1)
Sonny (5,10)
Subaru (7)
Rika (4,5,7,9)
Ryo (7)
Yoshi-Zo (5)
Yumeko (1)

Production 
Director:
Masahi Muto (1,2,3,6,8,10,11,12)
UGICHIN (4,5,7,9)
Director of Photography:
Masashi Muto (1,3,11)
Shoji Ueda (2,6,8,10)
Takeshi Hanzawa (12)
 Yuzuru Hashimoto (4,5,7,9)
Producer:
DNA (2)
Hayato Murakoshi (4,5,7,9)
Hiroshi Yamanouchi (11,12)
Keiichi Toyomura (9)
Maya Nishimoto (11)
Shunsuke Nakamura (10)
Sumitaka Fushimizu (1,3,6,8)
Yoshiki Ishii (11)
Lighting:
Akifumi Yonei (2,8,10,11)
Koji Furuyama (4,5,7,9)
Masayuki Ozawa (1,3)
Takahiro Tatara (6,12)
CG:
Masami Tanji(11)
Takayuki Taketa (12)
Yoshiyuki Odajima (11)
Colorist:
Yoshiro Kamei (4,5,7,9)
Editing:
Kim Yung Tae (5,7,9)
Kazuhiro Baba (1,2,3,6,8)
Kazuya Kurihara (4)
Tomoya Sato (12)
Toyokazu Tanno (10,11)
Hair & Make Up:
Akemi Nakano (2,3,4,5,10,11,12)
Satomi Kurihara (1,6,7,8,9)
Stylist:
Keiko Miyazawa (9)
Noriko Goto (1,2,3,4,5,6,7,8,10,11)
Tsugumi Watari (12)

Charts 
Album - Oricon DVD Sales Chart (Japan)

RIAJ certification 
As of December, 2005 "Filmography 2001-2005" has been certified gold for shipments of over 100,000 by the Recording Industry Association of Japan.

References 
 

Namie Amuro video albums
2005 compilation albums
2005 video albums
Music video compilation albums